The 1977–78 Challenge Cup was the 77th staging of rugby league's oldest knockout competition, the Challenge Cup.

The final was contested by Leeds and St. Helens at Wembley.

Leeds beat St. Helens on Saturday 13 May 1978 in front of a crowd of 96,000.

The winner of the Lance Todd Trophy was Saints forward, George Nicholls.

This was Leeds’ eleventh Cup final win in fifteen appearances and their second in successive years.

First round

Second round

Quarter-finals

Semi-finals

Final

References

External links
Challenge Cup official website 
Challenge Cup 1977/78 results at Rugby League Project

Challenge Cup
Challenge Cup